Two ships of the United States Navy have borne the name USS Ingersoll, honoring members of the Ingersoll family. DD-652 was named for Rear Admiral Royal R. Ingersoll (1847–1931) — and for his grandson, Lieutenant Royal R. Ingersoll, II (1913–1942) who had died in the Battle of Midway, just weeks before the ship's christening. DD-990 was named for RADM Ingersoll's son, Admiral Royal E. Ingersoll (1897–1975).

See also 

 , a World War II Liberty ship, launched in 1942 and scrapped in 1964

United States Navy ship names